Maccabi Ma'ale Adumim is a professional basketball club based in Ma'ale Adumim. The team plays in the Israeli National League.

Club history
The club first joined the Israeli Basketball Association in 2006. In 2015, they won the Union Cup. They played in the Liga Artzit, the Israeli third division, until 2021 when they were promoted to the Israeli National League after finishing first in the Artzit standings. They became the first team from Judea-Samari to participated in either of Israel's top two men's basketball leagues. In their first season in the National League in 2021–22, Ma'ale Adumim finished 11th out of 15 teams with an 11–17 record. The team hosted its home games at Givat Ram in Jerusalem in 2021–22 due to their home hall not meeting the standards required for National League games. In the opening game of the 2022–23 season, Ma'ale Adumim hosted their first National League game at its home Ulema.

References

External links
Eurobasket.com team profile

Basketball teams established in 2006
Basketball teams in Israel
Liga Leumit (basketball) teams
2006 establishments in Israel